Gillian Reid  is a British chemist who is Professor of Inorganic Chemistry and former Head of the Department of Chemistry at the University of Southampton. Her research considers coordination chemistry, inorganic semiconductors and metal fluoride scaffolds. In 2020 she was appointed the President-elect of the Royal Society of Chemistry, becoming President in 2022.

Early life and education 
Reid became interested in chemistry whilst at high school. She eventually studied chemistry at the University of Edinburgh, where she earned her bachelor's degree in 1986. She remained there for her doctoral research, where she studied macrocyclic complexes. After earning her degree in 1989, Reid moved to the University of Southampton for a postdoctoral research position.

Research and career 
In 1991 Reid joined the University of Southampton as a lecturer. She was promoted to Professor in 2006. Under her leadership, Southampton joined the Knowledge Centre for Materials Chemistry. Reid leads molecular assembly and structure at the University of Southampton.

Her research considers inorganic coordination chemistry, with a particular focus on the design of macrocyclic ligands that involve chalcogen donor atoms. She makes use of non-aqueous electrodeposition to grow inorganic semiconductor alloys. Electrodeposition allows for bottom-up growth without the need for an ultra-high vacuum environment. Reid has created molecular reagents that allow the synthesis of compounds for use in non-volatile memory, thermoelectric generators and two-dimensional materials. The reagents were used to deposit a wide variety of thin films including highly pure germanium telluride, molybdenum disulphide and tungsten disulphide.

In 2002, Reid co-founded the Southampton Science and Engineering Day, which has since evolved into the Southampton Science and Engineering Festival. The event was founded to coincide with British Science Week, which occurs annually in March. In 2010 Reid was made the Head of the Department of Chemistry Outreach Programme. In 2015 she co-led the Royal Society Summer Science exhibit Taking Technology Smaller, which introduced the public to electrochemistry as a means to build nanoscale electronic devices.

Awards and honours 
 2006 Vice Chancellor's Award for Teaching in Chemistry
 2007 Royal Society of Chemistry Award for Achievement in the Promotion of Chemistry
 2011 Elected a member of the council of the Royal Society of Chemistry
 2012 Elected Fellow of the Royal Society of Chemistry
 2020 Appointed the President-elect of the Royal Society of Chemistry
 2022 Elected Fellow of the Royal Society of Edinburgh

Selected publications

Personal life 
Reid has two children.

References

Living people
Year of birth missing (living people)
British chemists
Fellows of the Royal Society of Edinburgh
Fellows of the Royal Society of Chemistry